Nicolaas Wolmarans (5 March 1916 – 17 August 1994) was a South African boxer who competed in the 1938 British Empire Games. He was born in Zastron. In 1938, he won the gold medal in the light heavyweight class after winning the final against Cecil Overell of Australia.

External links

1916 births
1994 deaths
People from Mohokare Local Municipality
Light-heavyweight boxers
Heavyweight boxers
Boxers at the 1938 British Empire Games
Commonwealth Games gold medallists for South Africa
South African male boxers
Afrikaner people
Commonwealth Games medallists in boxing
Medallists at the 1938 British Empire Games